He Xiangning Art Museum is an art museum in Nanshan, Shenzhen, China.

Construction of the museum started in 1995 and was opened in 1997. The museum is named after He Xiangning, former leading person in the Revolutionary Committee of the KMT, wife of assassinated leader of the KMT left, Liao Zhongkai, mother of the late Overseas Chinese Commission Head Liao Chengzhi, and an amateur artist. It is the first national art museum in China to be named after a person. Its collections include some artworks by He Xiangning herself and it holds regular exhibitions and display of various contemporary art.

General Location 
The museum is located in the Overseas Chinese Town (OCT) area. Before the establishment of the Shenzhen SEZ, the Overseas Chinese Town area was a State Fram administered by the Overseas Chinese Commission. The relationship between He Xiangning and the then head of the Overseas Chinese Commission, her son Liao Chengzhi, is one reason for the naming of the Gallery after her. The gallery is near a number of tourist sites:
Window of the World
Splendid China Folk Village
Yitian Holiday Plaza

References

External links

Nanshan District, Shenzhen
Museums in Shenzhen
1997 establishments in China
Art museums established in 1997